The 1984 Tbilisi gas explosion was a gas explosion in a nine-storey apartment block in Tbilisi, Georgia on 2 December 1984 that killed at least 100 people.

References 

Tbilisi Gas Explosion, 1984
Tbilisi gas explosion
Explosions in 1984
Gas explosions
1980s in Tbilisi
Disasters in the Soviet Union
Explosions in Georgia (country)
December 1984 events in Asia